

Elite Women

January - March

April - June

July - September

October - December 

No major races.

Final rankings

Women's World Cup

UCI Road Rankings 
Source

References

 
 
Women's road cycling by year